The Olsen Gang is a Danish comedy film series created by Danish director Erik Balling and special effects expert Henning Bahs about the eponymous fictional criminal gang. The gang's leader is the criminal genius and habitual offender Egon Olsen and his accomplices are Benny and Kjeld (Kjell in Norwegian). The gang members are harmless, extremely rarely target ordinary citizens, and never deliberately use violence. The first film came in 1968; during the next thirty years a total of fourteen films were made.

A Norwegian version of the film series was also made (a total of 14 films from 1969 to 1999), in most cases based directly on the scripts for the Danish films. Later, starting in 1981, Sweden also produced their own version: Jönssonligan.

Plot 
Most of the films start with Egon coming out of jail and being enthusiastically welcomed by Benny and Kjeld. The three men will then have a beer together in the living room of Kjeld's home in Valby, where Egon will inform his friends of his latest plan, for making them millionaires. Plans are often two-step plans, where the first heist will get the equipment for the real, second plan. The plans usually feature everyday artifacts such as Lego, party balloons, cigarettes, etc., which are then brought together in surprising ways in elaborate and well-timed plans, often including clever social engineering. Bennys function in the heists, besides get-away-driver, is picking locks and starting machinery using  "The Thing", a specially shaped brass piece used for manipulating machinery and opening doors.
Egon often serves time with lawyers or executives who provide him with the information he needs, such as duty rosters for the national public record office. Egon is also a brilliant safecracker, operating manually, specializing in the fictive "Franz Jäger" brand.

Egon's plans often bring the gang into perilously close contact with white-collar criminals from the Danish business (and political) elite. For example, in the ninth installment named "Olsen-banden deruda" well-connected people try to make money out of the so-called "butter mountain", a huge amount of butter bought up and stored by the EEC (now the EU) to keep prices up. Egon Olsen learns about this from a lawyer who is serving prison time, and the gang interferes with the plan to secure the millions for themselves. But as always, Egon – after having succeeded with a genius plan – fails for a variety of reasons, for instance underestimating the power and unscrupulousness of these people, bad luck, interference from Kjeld's wife Yvonne, or other surprising elements. For several movies, the role of the antagonist was filled by CEO Hallandsen of the fictive, multinational company Hallandsen Inc. - or variations thereof.
Egon is usually arrested in the end, for various reasons: scapegoat, bad luck, some irrelevant crime, or even turning himself in as a matter of honor.

A recurring part of the film is making fun of Danish authorities, especially the police. In some earlier installments, the clumsy Police Inspector Mortensen is used for slapstick comic relief; he is later replaced by Superintendent Jensen, an older, troubled man who has seen better days. He is a resigned character who despises the Danish government as he often criticizes Hallandsen crimes going unnoticed and mentions to his assistant, Inspector Holm: "The only thing the police can do when the real big criminals come by is offer them protection!" Jensen incredulously uses the recurring exclamation "Bagmændene!" (Behind-men/Big Fishes) to reference the in-joke of powerful players moving outside of the law.

In the early installments, profanity and soft-erotica (scantily-clad women) were more freely used than in later ones, where said content was somewhat watered down to suit younger viewers.
Later movies focused on the satirical interplay between Jensen and Holm and Egon and his crew, with a frequent outburst of anger from Egon. His long list of slurs is especially famous, like "social democrats!", "insane woman!" (to Yvonne), "lousy amateurs!", "cowards!", "dog heads!", "porridge peasants!", "sop!", "scumbags!", to name a few.

Characters 

Recurring characters in the Danish version:
 Egon Olsen: Gang leader, expert safecracker, brilliant but short-tempered and occasionally overdramatic
 Benny Frandsen: Gang member, get-away driver, always cheerful and handles practical stuff 
 Kjeld Jensen: Gang member, tool master, ever nervous and humble, but does on a rare occasion rise to meet any challenge
 Yvonne Jensen: Kjeld's very bossy wife, often with firm plans on how to use the millions from the various plans
 Børge Jensen: Kjeld and Yvonne's son, occasionally an impeccable part of the schemes
 Dynamite Harry: Benny's brother, explosives expert (at least in his own opinion) and deeply alcoholic
 Jensen: Superintendent at Copenhagen Police, somewhat disillusioned and mostly forgotten by the brass in his basement office
 Holm: Detective with Copenhagen Police, young and with high ambitions, but somewhat naive
 Mortensen: An overambitious but very clumsy inspector with Copenhagen Police appearing in the early films
 Holm-Hansen/Bang-Johansen/Hallandsen: A role with the same actor playing various villains, always on top of the social hierarchy, most often also with international contacts
 King and Knight: A confidence trickster and his violent nephew
 Bøffen (The Beef): Enforcer and muscleman for Hallandsen and others
 Hansen: Rival gang leader with theme music from Bob le flambeur

International versions 
The Olsen Gang have been made in Norwegian and Swedish (Jönssonligan) versions too. While both remakes follow a generally similar formula to the Danish films, the Swedish version diverges considerably from the Danish original in terms of storylines and character development.

Norwegian Olsenbanden 
The Norwegian remakes were, with two exceptions, directed by Knut Bohwim based on Balling and Bahs's original scripts with minor adaptations to Norwegian conditions. For example, some names of the main characters were changed: Kjeld became Kjell, Yvonne became Valborg, and Børge became Basse. The character of Benny's brother, Dynamite Harry, was used much more often in the Norwegian films than in the original Danish series, with six appearances.

Swedish Jönssonligan 

In the Swedish version, the Egon character is called Charles-Ingvar "Sickan" Jönsson, with a slightly different costume and mannerisms, and was a huge success for the actor Gösta Ekman until the actor got tired of the character and left the series. Benny's character was named (Ragnar) Vanheden, a small-timer from Stockholm, played by Ulf Brunnberg. Kjeld's character was named Rocky, but appeared only in the first two films. From the second film, the character Dynamit-Harry played by Björn Gustafson (who has had rather minor parts in the original Danish films) was featured instead. Although starting out as a strict remake, after a while the franchise started writing their own scripts.

The Swedish franchise eventually expanded into movies of the band as young kids: Lilla Jönssonligan (little Jönsson band) with four features to date.

There was also an attempt to reboot the franchise, featuring brand new actors in the adult roles. Jönssonligan – Den perfekta stöten (2015) was released to middling reviews and poor box office.

Danish films 
The first thirteen films were directed by Erik Balling, while Tom Hedegaard and Morten Arnfred directed the fourteenth and final Olsen Gang film. The scripts were written by Balling and Henning Bahs, who also worked as a production designer.

{| class="wikitable" style="text-align:center;"
! English title (Original title) !! Release date !! Notes
|-
|| The Olsen Gang (Olsen-banden) || October 11, 1968 ||
|-
|| The Olsen Gang in a Fix (Olsen-banden på spanden) || October 3, 1969 ||
|-
|| The Olsen Gang in Jutland (Olsen-banden i Jylland) || October 8, 1971 ||
|-
|| The Olsen Gang's Big Score (Olsen-bandens store kup) || October 6, 1972 ||
|-
|| The Olsen Gang Goes Crazy (Olsen-banden går amok) || October 5, 1973 ||
|-
|| The Last Exploits of the Olsen Gang (Olsen-bandens sidste bedrifter) || October 4, 1974 || This was intended to be the last movie at the time it was made.
|-
|| The Olsen Gang on the Track (Olsen-banden på sporet) || September 26, 1975 ||
|-
|| The Olsen Gang Sees Red (Olsen-banden ser rødt) || October 1, 1976 || This movie contains the famous showdown scene in which the gang bombs, drills, and hammers its way through the basement of the Royal Danish Theatre in synchronicity with the music of Friedrich Kuhlau's overture to the opera Elverhøj.
|-
||  (Olsen-banden deruda''') || September 30, 1977 ||
|-
||  (Olsen-banden går i krig) || October 6, 1978 ||
|-
||  (Olsen-banden overgiver sig aldrig) || October 26, 1979 ||
|-
||  (Olsen-bandens flugt over plankeværket) || October 16, 1981 ||
|-
|| Olsen-banden over alle bjerge (The Olsen Gang Long Gone) || December 26, 1981 ||
|-
|| The Olsen Gang's Last Trick (Olsen-bandens sidste stik) || December 18, 1998 || The actor in the role as "Kjeld Jensen", Poul Bundgaard, died while filming the last movie. The actor Tommy Kenter stepped in to fill his role to finish the film. This was hidden through various effects and cover-up techniques.
|-
| colspan=3 | 
|}

 Danish cast 
 Ove Sprogøe as Egon Olsen
 Morten Grunwald as Benny Frandsen
 Poul Bundgaard as Kjeld Jensen
 Kirsten Walther as Yvonne Jensen
 Jes Holtsø as Børge Jensen
 Axel Strøbye as Superintendent of police Jensen
 Ole Ernst as Police inspector Holm (Dick Kaysø replaces Ernst in one film) 
 Ove Verner Hansen as Bøffen
 Preben Kaas as Dynamite-Harry
 Peter Steen and Jesper Langberg as Mortensen (Steen appeared in two films, Langberg in one film)

 Spin-offs 
A Danish TV series and a feature film have been made showing the main characters as children, following the Swedish success of Lilla Jönssonligan:
 Olsen-bandens første kup (TV series, 1999–2000)
 Olsen-banden Junior (2001)

Two computer animated films have been released in the 2010s:
 Olsen-banden på de bonede gulve (The Olsen Gang Gets Polished, 2010)
 Olsen-banden på dybt vand (The Olsen Gang in Deep Trouble, 2013)

 Norwegian films 

 Olsenbanden Operasjon Egon (1969)
 Olsenbanden og Dynamitt-Harry (1970)
 Olsenbanden tar gull (1972)
 Olsenbanden og Dynamitt-Harry går amok (1973)
 Olsenbanden møter Kongen og Knekten (1974)
 Olsenbandens siste bedrifter (1975)
 Olsenbanden for full musikk (1976)
 Olsenbanden og Dynamitt-Harry på sporet (1977)
 Olsenbanden og Data-Harry sprenger verdensbanken (1978)
 Olsenbanden mot nye høyder (1979)
 Olsenbanden gir seg aldri (1981)
 Olsenbandens aller siste kupp (1982)
 …men Olsenbanden var ikke død (1984)
 Olsenbandens siste stikk (1999)
 Olsenbanden – Siste skrik! (2022)

Several elements recur in the film series. As the Japanese carmaker Toyota was usually the main sponsor of the film series, most cars, including the villain's cars, the security cars, the police cars, the gang's car, civilian cars parked on the sidewalks, etc., were supplied by the company. Models include the Crown as taxis, Toyota Cressida as police cars, Hiace as security vans and money transports, and so on. There have been exceptions, notably Olsenbandens aller siste kupp (The Olsen-Gang's Very Last Coup) from 1982, which was sponsored by Datsun.

In 2022, a film reboot with a new team of actors was released, where the Olsen Gang make plans to steal the painting The Scream from the Munch Museum.
 Norwegian DVDs 
Most of the Norwegian films have been digitally restored. The discs include English & Norwegian Subtitles, 16:9 format and Dolby Digital 1.0 surround sound.

DVD release list:
 Olsenbanden Operasjon Egon (27 October 2004)
 Olsenbanden og Dynamitt-Harry (27 October 2004)
 Olsenbanden tar gull (27 October 2004)
 Olsenbanden og Dynamitt-Harry går amok Olsenbanden møter Kongen og Knekten (1 December 2004)
 Olsenbandens siste bedrifter (1 December 2004)
 Olsenbanden for full musikk (1 December 2004)
 Olsenbanden og Dynamitt-Harry på sporet (8 December 2004)
 Olsenbanden og Data-Harry sprenger verdensbanken (19 January 2005)
 Olsenbanden mot nye høyder (19 January 2005)Olsenbanden gir seg aldri (19 January 2005)
 Olsenbandens aller siste kupp (19 January 2005)
 ...men Olsenbanden var ikke død Olsenbandens siste stikk (1999)

 Norwegian cast 
 Arve Opsahl as Egon Olsen
 Sverre Holm as Benny Fransen
 Carsten Byhring as Kjell Jensen
 Aud Schønemann as Valborg Jensen
 Willie Hoel as Bartender Hansen
 Ove Verner Hansen as Biffen
 Pål Johannessen as Basse Jensen (appears in eight films)
 Sverre Wilberg as Superintendent of police Hermansen
 Øivind Blunck, Oddbjørn Hesjevoll, Ulf Wengård and Anders Hatlo as Police inspector Holm (Blunck appears in five films, and Hesjevoll, Wengård and Hatlo in one film each respectively)
 Harald Heide-Steen Jr. as Dynamite-Harry

 Spin-offs 
The Danish TV series showing the gang during their childhood, Olsen-bandens første kup, was remade in Norway as Olsenbandens første kupp. There has also been made an entire feature film series, Olsenbanden Jr., with six films from 2003 to 2010, inspired by the Swedish Lilla Jönssonligan.

 In popular culture 
The popularity of the film series inspired a Norwegian restaurant chain, Egon, with the logo alluding to Egon Olsen's iconic hat and cigar.

Semic published five Norwegian comic albums featuring the Olsen Gang, eight original stories, starting with "Olsenbanden raner hurtigruta!"'' published in 1983.

In June 2019, the Norwegian Postal service issued two stamps to celebrate the first film's 50th anniversary. The domestic stamp depicts Egon leaving prison, which is the opening scene in most of the films. The European stamp shows the whole gang, including Harry and Valborg.

The dubbed versions of the series have also enjoyed great popularity in the former GDR and can still be seen regularly on regional television stations. More than 3000 people are members of the German Olsenbanden fan club. The stage name of Betterov, a musician from Thuringia, is a reference to the eponymous supporting character Betterøv in the series.

References

Notes

External links 

 Olsenbande-Drehorte (Olsen Gang Film-Locations)
 Some of the original Danish trailers
 IMDB on the original Danish film

 
1960s heist films
1970s heist films
1980s heist films
Danish film series
Danish-language films
Fictional gangs
Films adapted into comics
Films directed by Erik Balling
Film series introduced in 1968